Saqer Otaif  (born 22 August 1991) is a Saudi Arabian professional footballer who plays as a forward.

References

External links 
 

1990s births
Living people
Saudi Arabian footballers
Al-Shabab FC (Riyadh) players
Louletano D.C. players
Al-Wehda Club (Mecca) players
Al-Taawoun FC players
Al-Raed FC players
Ohod Club players
Al-Fateh SC players
Al-Fayha FC players
Al-Qadsiah FC players
Expatriate footballers in Portugal
Saudi Arabian expatriate sportspeople in Portugal
Saudi Arabian expatriate footballers
Sportspeople from Riyadh
Saudi First Division League players
Saudi Professional League players
Association football forwards